Shiv Raj Joshi is a Nepalese politician. He was elected to the Pratinidhi Sabha in the 1999 election on behalf of the Nepali Congress. He is the founder of Nepali Congress in Karnali. He was elected to the House of Representatives from Surkhet in the 2048, 2051 and 2056 BS. elections on behalf of the Nepali Congress. He has been a Minister of the Government of Nepal three times. Initially an Assistant Minister, for the second time Minister of State and also Minister of Information, Communications and Transport, he rose to the prestigious position of the country. Joshi's father Dharmaraj Joshi was a Jimuwal of the Rekcha Panchayat period. According to the people of Surkhet, the locals were known by the name of Shivraj Joshi.  Joshi was born in the former Midwestern Development Region, Rekcha Panchayat, now Karnali Pradesh, Surkhet, Chaukune village municipality. Joshi is a permanent resident of Chaukune Village Municipality Ward No. 8 Gutu.

References

Living people
Nepali Congress politicians from Karnali Province
Year of birth missing (living people)
Place of birth missing (living people)
Nepal MPs 1994–1999
Nepal MPs 1991–1994
Nepal MPs 1999–2002